Harty Road Halt is a disused railway station between Eastchurch and Leysdown-on-Sea. It opened in 1905 and closed in 1950.

References

External links
 Harty Road Halt station on navigable 1947 O. S. map
 Picture of Harty Road Halt station

Disused railway stations in Kent
Former Sheppey Light Railway stations
Railway stations in Great Britain opened in 1905
Railway stations in Great Britain closed in 1950